There are at least 41 species of Lichens, Ascomycota known to exist in Montana. The Montana Natural Heritage Program has identified a number of lichen species as Species of Concern.

The Ascomycota are a Division/Phylum of the kingdom Fungi, and subkingdom Dikarya. Its members are commonly known as the sac fungi. They are the largest phylum of Fungi, with over 64,000 species. The defining feature of this fungal group is the "ascus" (from Greek:  (askos), meaning "sac" or "wineskin"), a microscopic sexual structure in which nonmotile spores, called ascospores, are formed. However, some species of the Ascomycota are asexual, meaning that they do not have a sexual cycle and thus do not form asci or ascospores. Previously placed in the Deuteromycota along with asexual species from other fungal taxa, asexual (or anamorphic) ascomycetes are now identified and classified based on morphological or physiological similarities to ascus-bearing taxa, and by phylogenetic analyses of DNA sequences.

 Arctomiaceae
 Delicate arctomia lichen, Arctomia delicatula
 Brigantiaeaceae
 Brick-spored firedot lichen, Brigantiaea praetermissa
 Cladoniaceae
 Thorn cladonia lichen, Cladonia uncialis
 Wooden soldiers lichen, Cladonia botrytes
 Collemataceae
 Jelly lichen, Collema curtisporum
 Coniocybaceae
 Collared glass whiskers lichen, Sclerophora amabilis
 Hymeneliaceae
 Vagrant aspicilia lichen, Aspicilia fruticulosa
 Lecanoraceae
 Wanderlust lichen, Rhizoplaca haydenii
 Lobariaceae
 Cabbage lungwort lichen, Lobaria linita
 Gray lungwort lichen, Lobaria hallii
 Netted specklebelly lichen, Pseudocyphellaria anomala
 Textured lungwort lichen, Lobaria scrobiculata
 Thorn lichen, Dendriscocaulon umhausense
 Pannariaceae
 Lead lichen, Parmeliella triptophylla
 Parmeliaceae
 Camouflage lichen, Melanelia commixta
 Chestnut wrinkle-lichen, Cetraria sepincola
 Foxtail lichen, Nodobryoria subdivergens
 Frosted finger lichen, Dactylina ramulosa
 Mountain oakmoss lichen, Evernia divaricata
 Northern camouflage lichen, Melanelia septentrionalis
 Ribbon rag lichen, Platismatia stenophylla
 Ring lichen, Arctoparmelia subcentrifuga
 Shield lichen, Parmelia fraudans
 Tattered rag lichen, Platismatia herrei
 Peltigeraceae
 Chocolate chip lichen, Solorina bispora
 Chocolate chip lichen, Solorina octospora
 Fringed chocolate chip lichen, Solorina spongiosa
 Fringed pelt lichen, Peltigera pacifica
 Waterfan lichen, Peltigera hydrothyria
 Pertusariaceae
 Wart lichen, Pertusaria diluta
 Physciaceae
 Shadow lichen, Phaeophyscia kairamoi
 Psoraceae
 Scale lichen, Psora rubiformis
 Ramalinaceae
 Hooded ramalina lichen, Ramalina obtusata
 Powdery twig lichen, Ramalina pollinaria
 Slit-rimmed ramalina lichen, Ramalina subleptocarpha
 Sphaerophoraceae
 Coral lichen, Sphaerophorus tuckermanii
 Stereocaulaceae
 Easter lichen, Stereocaulon paschale
 Umbilicariaceae
 Rock tripe lichen, Umbilicaria havaasii
 Rock tripe lichen, Umbilicaria hirsuta
 Verrucariaceae
 Elf-ear lichen, Normandina pulchella
 Speck lichen, Verrucaria kootenaica

Further reading

See also

Ethnolichenology
Lichenometry
Lichenology
 Coniferous plants of Montana
 Monocotyledons of Montana

Notes

Montana
Lichen
Lichens